Homoeographa mexicana is a species of snout moth described by Herbert H. Neunzig in 1994. It is found along the west-central coast of Mexico.

The length of the forewings is about 7 mm. The forewings are mostly ochre and reddish brown. The hindwings are pale smoky fuscous, but darker on the veins and near the costal and outer margins.

References

Phycitinae
Moths described in 1994